The 2010 World Cyber Games (also known as WCG 2010) took place from September 30 to October 3, 2010, in the Los Angeles Convention Center, Los Angeles, US. The event hosted 450 competing players from 58 countries competing over prizes worth over $250,000.

Official games

PC games 
 Carom3D
 Dead or Alive Xtreme Beach Volleyball
 FIFA 10
 StarCraft: Brood War
 TrackMania Nations Forever
 Warcraft III: The Frozen Throne

Xbox 360 games 
 Forza Motorsport 3
 Guitar Hero 5
 Tekken 6

Mobile games 
 Asphalt 5
 Angry Birds
 Minesweeper
 Fun Run
 Grand Theft Auto
 SNAKE

Promotion games 
 League of Legends
 Lost Saga
 Quake Wars Online

Results

Official

Promotion

References

External links 
 WCG 2010

2010 in American sports
2010 in sports in California
2010 in esports
League of Legends competitions
StarCraft competitions
Warcraft competitions
World Cyber Games events
International esports competitions hosted by the United States